Roz McCall (born 1969/1970) is a Scottish politician. She is a member of the Scottish Conservative and Unionist Party, and a Member of the Scottish Parliament (MSP) for the Mid Scotland and Fife region.

Early life 
McCall grew up in Glasgow, and left school with an apprenticeship at House of Fraser.

Political career 
In the 2017 Perth and Kinross Council election, she was elected in Strathearn ward.

McCall replaced Dean Lockhart in the Scottish Parliament in 2022 - who had resigned - as an additional member for the Mid Scotland and Fife electoral region. Upon taking her seat in the Scottish Parliament on 20 September 2022, she became the first MSP to swear allegiance to King Charles III, following the death of Queen Elizabeth II earlier that month.

Personal life 
McCall lives in Auchterarder with her husband and two daughters.

References 

Place of birth missing (living people)
Year of birth missing (living people)
Living people

Conservative MSPs
Members of the Scottish Parliament 2021–2026
Female members of the Scottish Parliament
21st-century Scottish women politicians